Gindetta Mariani (1870-1950), also credited as Guiditta Mariani was an Italian botanist, mycologist, and plant taxonomist.

Identified species
Pleospora arundinis Mariani, Atti della Societtaliana di scienze naturali e del Museo civico di storia naturale di Milano 50: 166 (1911)

References

1870 births
1950 deaths
20th-century Italian botanists
Women botanists
Italian mycologists
20th-century Italian women scientists